África Brasil is a 1976 release by Brazilian artist Jorge Ben, recording at the time as Jorge Ben. It was Ben's 14th studio album. África Brasil represented a milestone in Ben's career with his switch to electric guitar and incorporation of both Afro-Brazilian and American funk music styles into his sound. África Brasil is one of Ben's best-known recordings. Rolling Stone Brazil listed it as one of the 100 best Brazilian albums in history, and it was included in both Robert Dimery's 1001 Albums You Must Hear Before You Die as well as Tom Moon's collection 1,000 Recordings to Hear Before You Die.

Music

For África Brasil Ben reworked three of his earlier compositions: "A Princesa e o Plebeu" from Sacundin Ben Samba, "Taj Mahal" from Ben, and "Zumbi" from A Tábua de Esmeralda. The album's opening track "Ponta de Lança Africano (Umbabarauma)", a song about an African football striker, became a well known soccer-associated track. It was later included on David Byrne's 1989 compilation Brazil Classics Beleza Tropical, prompting rotation of a video for the track on VH-1. In 1991 Ambitious Lovers released a cover version on 12-inch single that became a dance hit. A version by Soulfly was released in 1998 as a single. The original version of the track was used in the documentary film Di/Glauber.

In 1978 British rock singer Rod Stewart lifted a melody from "Taj Mahal" for his hit song "Da Ya Think I'm Sexy?". Ben filed a plagiarism lawsuit against Stewart, the upshot of which was Stewart's agreement to donate his royalties from the song to the United Nations Children's Fund (UNICEF). Stewart also performed the song at the Music for UNICEF Concert at the United Nations General Assembly in January 1979.

Track listing 
All tracks written by Jorge Ben

Personnel

Musicians
 Jorge Ben - vocals, guitar
 João Roberto Vandaluz - piano
 Dadi Carvalho - bass guitar
 Gustavo Schroeter - drum kit
 Joãozinho Pereira - percussion
 Pedrinho das Neves - drums, timbales
 Wilson das Neves - drums, timbales
 José Roberto Bertrami - keyboards
 Luna - bass drum
 Neném - cuica
 Djalma Corrêa - percussion
 Hermes - percussion
 Ariovaldo - percussion
 Oberdan Magalhães - percussion
 Márcio Montarroyos - percussion

Song arrangements were by Jorge Ben, with orchestral arrangements by José Roberto Bertrami.

Mazzola arranged the vocals and was the studio production director, assisted by Ary Carvalhaes, Luigi Hoffer, Paulo Sérgio "Chocô", João Moreira, and Rafael Azulay at Phonogram.

Aldo Luiz designed the album's cover and Jorge Vianna finalized the album's art with photography by Orlando Abrunhosa.

The album was released by Phillips in 1976, with productions and distribution by Phonogram.

References 

Jorge Ben albums
1976 albums
Funk albums by Brazilian artists